Doue is a commune in the Seine-et-Marne department in the Île-de-France region in north-central France.

Demographics
Inhabitants of Doue are called Dovinciens.

Geography

Doue is located in eastern Paris basin, in the part of the Brie historically known for Brie lousy. The town is located about halfway between Paris (61 km) and Reims (77 km)2.

See also
Communes of the Seine-et-Marne department

References

External links

1999 Land Use, from IAURIF (Institute for Urban Planning and Development of the Paris-Île-de-France région) 

Communes of Seine-et-Marne